Checker Records is an inactive record label that was started in 1952 as a subsidiary of Chess Records in Chicago, Illinois. The label was founded by the Chess brothers, Leonard and Phil, who ran the label until they sold it to General Recorded Tape (GRT) in 1969, shortly before Leonard's death.

The label released recordings by mostly African American artists and groups. Checker's releases cover a wide range of genres including blues (Little Walter, Sonny Boy Williamson II), rhythm and blues (Sax Mallard, Jimmy McCracklin), doo-wop (The Flamingos, The Moonglows), gospel (Aretha Franklin, Five Blind Boys of Mississippi), rock and roll (Bo Diddley, Dale Hawkins), and soul (Gene Chandler).

The label was discontinued in 1971 following GRT's consolidation of the Chess catalogs. As with Cadet and Chess, the label's catalog is now owned by Universal Music Group and releases from the Checker catalog are released by Geffen Records and Chess.

History 
Due to the recent expansion of Chess Records, as well as to achieve greater airplay for singles, the Chess brothers opened up a subsidiary label named Checker. The first 45/78 rpm single released by the label was "Slow Caboose" b/w "Darling, Let's Give Love a Chance" by Sax Mallard and his Orchestra, which was released as Checker 750 in April 1952.

The label's most popular artist, in the label's early years, was Little Walter, who had ten songs released by Checker that made the Top Ten of Billboard magazine's Top Rhythm & Blues Records charts.  Among those ten was "Juke" which topped the charts and was inducted into the Grammy Hall of Fame in 2008.

Checker released several singles by well-established blues artists such as Elmore James, Arthur "Big Boy" Crudup (credited as Perry Lee Crudup), and Memphis Minnie, none of which sold well. One well-established blues artist that did manage to make a hit on Checker was Sonny Boy Williamson II, who charted with "Don't Start Me Talkin'" (number 3) in 1955, "Keep It to Yourself" (number 14) in 1956, and "Help Me" (number 24) in 1963.

On March 2, 1955, the Chess brothers recorded their first rock and roll artist, Bo Diddley. From this session came Bo's self-titled debut single on Checker, which topped the R&B charts and was inducted into the Grammy Hall of Fame in 1998. Another one of Bo Diddley's Checker singles, "Who Do You Love?", was inducted in 2010. In 1957, Checker cracked into the rockabilly market with Dale Hawkins, who had a crossover hit with "Susie Q", although he could not repeat the single's success.

In 1958, Checker released its first 12" 33⅓ rpm LP record, The Best of Little Walter, which was released as Checker LP-1428.

Discography
The original Checker LP series started with six albums released as part of the Chess 1425 album series before switching to the 2970 series in 1959 and continued until 1970.

See also
 List of record labels
 Checker Records albums
 Checker Records singles

References

External links

Checker Records on the Internet Archive's Great 78 Project

American record labels
Record labels established in 1952
Record labels disestablished in 1971
Pop record labels
1969 mergers and acquisitions
1952 establishments in Illinois
Chess Records